Steven Lennon (born 20 January 1988) is a Scottish footballer who plays as a forward in the Icelandic Besta-deild karla for FH. 

He has previously played for Rangers, Partick Thistle, Lincoln City, Dundalk, Newport County, Fram Reykjavík and Sandnes Ulf.

Career

Rangers
Lennon was born in Irvine, North Ayrshire. He started off his career as a midfielder but changed to a striker, becoming a regular for the Rangers reserve team. He made his debut for the Rangers first team in a Scottish Premier League match against Inverness on 27 December 2006, coming on as a substitute for Nacho Novo.

Lennon became known as a prolific goalscorer, scoring numerous goals for Rangers' under-19s in the 2006–07 season including a hat-trick in a 3–3 draw with Dundee United. He then scored a hat-trick in Rangers' 5–0 defeat of rivals Celtic in the Scottish Youth Cup final on 26 April 2007.

On 3 December 2007, Lennon signed a new contract that was to have seen him tied to the club until at least 2010.

Lennon joined Partick Thistle on loan on 16 August 2008. The deal lasted until 26 January 2009.

Lennon subsequently joined English club Lincoln City on loan on 1 February 2010. The loan deal covered the period until the end of the 2009–10 season. Lennon was offered a permanent deal at Lincoln at the end of the season and despite stating he would be delighted to sign for the Imps on a permanent basis, he complained that he could not find anywhere to live in the City and missed Chris Sutton's deadline. Sutton withdrew the offer and Lennon returned to Rangers, where he was released at the end of his contract.

Dundalk
In July 2010 Lennon signed for Dundalk until the end of the Irish season, although he broke his foot less than a month into the deal.

Newport County
In February 2011 Lennon signed for Newport County, where he was reunited with former Dundalk players Wayne Hatswell and Tom Miller. He rejected a contract offer in May 2011.

Fram Reykjavik
In July 2011 he joined Fram who play in Iceland's premier league Úrvalsdeild. He marked his debut for the club by scoring the only goal in their 1–0 victory at Víkingur on 18 July 2011. He signed a new one-year contract with the club in October 2012.

Sandnes Ulf
In July 2013 he joined Sandnes Ulf, agreeing a two and a half-year contract with the club. The move arose after the club had been recommended to Lennon by his one-time Rangers teammate Thomas Kind Bendiksen.

FH
In July 2014, Lennon returned to the Úrvalsdeild, signing a three-year contract with FH.

Career statistics

Club

References

External links

Scotland stats at Scottish FA

1988 births
Living people
Footballers from Irvine, North Ayrshire
Scottish footballers
Scotland under-21 international footballers
Association football forwards
Rangers F.C. players
Partick Thistle F.C. players
Lincoln City F.C. players
Dundalk F.C. players
Newport County A.F.C. players
Knattspyrnufélagið Fram players
Sandnes Ulf players
Fimleikafélag Hafnarfjarðar players
Scottish Premier League players
Scottish Football League players
Eliteserien players
Expatriate footballers in Iceland
Úrvalsdeild karla (football) players
Expatriate footballers in Norway
Scottish expatriate sportspeople in Norway
British expatriates in Iceland
English Football League players
League of Ireland players
Expatriate association footballers in the Republic of Ireland
Scottish expatriate footballers
Scottish expatriate sportspeople in Ireland